Carl Allison (June 2, 1933 – December 3, 2013) was an American football player and coach of football and baseball. He was a four-year starter for coach Bud Wilkinson at the University of Oklahoma from 1951 to 1954, finishing his career as the team captain of the undefeated 1954 Oklahoma Sooners football team.

Of Allison, Wilkinson wrote, "I never hope to coach a finer football player (than Allison). Carl started every game we have played the last four years. He was never late to practice, never hurt, never sick. He was a fine captain. He is a straight B student. In reliability and character he stands at the very top of our squad. We could always depend on him to do his job well.

"I don't mean to take anything away from our other more-publicized boys but I've never seen a better all-around football player, nor a more reliable one, than Carl Allison."

Allison was also chosen for Notre Dame coach Frank Leahy's all-opponents team in both 1952 and 1953. He was later named to the Oklahoma Sooners 1950s All-Decade Team.

Allison was selected in the 22nd round of the 1955 NFL Draft by the Chicago Bears, coached by George Halas.

Straight from Allison's brief time with the Chicago Bears, he became the head football coach at Clinton High School in Clinton, Oklahoma, compiling a record of 24–16. He then became the head football coach at Harding University in Searcy, Arkansas from 1959 to 1963, reinstating a program that had not competed since 1931. After re-establishing that program and turning it over to his top assistant and fellow Oklahoma native John Prock, Allison returned to work in 1964 and 1965 for Wilkinson's Oklahoma Sooners as a scout. He then later returned to Harding as baseball coach.

Allison later became a preacher at White's Ferry Road Church of Christ in West Monroe, Louisiana.

Head coaching record

College football

References

1933 births
2013 deaths
American football ends
Harding Bisons baseball coaches
Harding Bisons football coaches
Oklahoma Sooners football players
High school football coaches in Oklahoma
People from Pittsburg County, Oklahoma
Coaches of American football from Oklahoma
Players of American football from Oklahoma
Baseball coaches from Oklahoma
American members of the Churches of Christ